Dahandar (also known as Dahaneh-ye Dahandar) is a village in Cheraghabad Rural District, Tukahur District, Minab County, Hormozgan Province, Iran. At the 2006 census, its population was 122, in 32 families.

References 

Populated places in Minab County